The Hungry Detective is a show on Food Network which premiered on October 17, 2006.  The host is Chris Cognac, a police detective from Southern California.  Cognac earlier appeared in Episode 4 of Food Network's Feasting on Asphalt.

Chris Cognac's mom is Louisa Tennille and his aunt is Toni Tennille, the singing half of Captain & Tennille.

References

External links

Food Network original programming
2000s American reality television series
2010s American reality television series
2006 American television series debuts